The 1830 Massachusetts gubernatorial election was held on April 5.

National Republican Governor Levi Lincoln Jr. was re-elected to a sixth term in office over Democrat Marcus Morton.

General election

Candidates
Levi Lincoln Jr., incumbent Governor since 1825 (National Republican)
Marcus Morton, Associate Justice of the Supreme Judicial Court, former acting Governor and nominee since 1828 (Democratic)

Campaign
For the first time, Justice Morton consented to his nomination. Privately, he expressed little hope of success and said that he did not hope to obtain more than one third of the votes.

David Henshaw's Statesman campaigned vigorously for Morton, upbraiding Lincoln as a renegade Republican who had accepted support of the Essex Junto and lauding Morton's support for the Warren Bridge Company. Theodore Lyman II's rival Democratic Evening Bulletin made no effort on Morton's behalf.

Lincoln took little interest in the election, focusing on new projects for railroads and Massachusetts's claim for war debts against the federal government.

Results
Lincoln was once again victorious, though by a dramatically reduced margin. Morton wrote to John C. Calhoun to express his view that the Jackson administration had cost him several thousand votes by dismissing Henshaw supporters from federal office to placate the aristocratic Lyman wing of the party.

See also
 1829–1830 Massachusetts legislature

References

Governor
1830
Massachusetts
November 1830 events